Wiese Islands is a group of small islands lying  south of Karelin Islands, off the east side of Renaud Island in the Biscoe Islands. First accurately shown on an Argentine government chart of 1957. Named by the United Kingdom Antarctic Place-Names Committee (UK-APC) in 1959 for Vladimir Wiese, Soviet climatologist and oceanographer, a pioneer of ice forecasting methods and author of numerous works on sea ice in the Arctic.

See also 
 List of Antarctic and sub-Antarctic islands

Islands of the Biscoe Islands